Hezbut Tawheed is a Bangladesh-based religious group which is currently blacklisted by Bangladeshi law enforcing agencies for their alleged connection with militancy.

History 
Muhammad Bayazeed Khan Panni, the family of the traditional Panni family of Tangail, founded Hezbut Tawheed on 16 February 1995. 

The Daily Star reported on 19 January 2008 that Hezbut Tawheed was teaching Jihad in Patuakhali District through books written by Panni.

After the death of Panni in 2012, Hossain Mohammad Salim of Noakhali district took charge of the organization. According to its website, it has offices and organizational activities in all the districts of Bangladesh.

Controversy 
Although the organization claims that they are working against militancy and communalism, the group was blacklisted by Bangladeshi law enforcing agencies in 2008. Bangladesh Bank also issued a warning to the banking sectors of Bangladesh against joining any programmes organised by the group or its associated bodies.

References 

Religious organisations based in Bangladesh